There have been two Calder Baronetcies.

The Calder Baronetcy, of Muirton in the County of Moray, was created in the Baronetage of Nova Scotia on 5 November 1686 for James Calder. The baronetcy became either extinct or dormant on the death of the sixth baronet, William Henry Walsingham Calder, in 1887.

The Calder Baronetcy, of Southwick in the County of Southampton, was created in the Baronetage of Great Britain on 22 August 1798 for Captain Sir Robert Calder, third son of the third Baronet of the 1686 creation. It became extinct on his death in 1818.

Calder baronets, of Muirton (1686)

Sir James Calder, 1st Baronet (1657–1711)
Sir Thomas Calder, 2nd Baronet (1682–1760)
Sir James Calder, 3rd Baronet (1712–1774)
Major General Sir Henry Calder, 4th Baronet (1743–1792)
Sir Henry Roddam Calder, 5th Baronet (1790–1868)
Sir William Henry Walsingham Calder, 6th Baronet (1821–1887)

Calder baronets, of Southwick (1798)
Sir Robert Calder, 1st Baronet (1745–1818)

References
 

Dormant baronetcies in the Baronetage of Nova Scotia
Extinct baronetcies in the Baronetage of Great Britain